Ashish Jitendra Desai  (born 5 July 1962) is an Indian Judge. He is currently Acting Chief Justice of Gujarat High Court. He is a Judge of Gujarat High Court.

References 

Indian judges
Chief justices of India
1962 births
Living people